Silicon Milkroundabout is a series of job fairs held in London and Edinburgh for the UK tech start-up community. The event was set up by Songkick to attract computer science talent to the startup community. The event's name is a portmanteau of Silicon Roundabout and the Milk round university recruiting events.

Eric Van Der Kleij the chief executive of the Tech City Investment Organization said: "The technology industry is flourishing in the UK, and digital and tech companies are providing increasing opportunities for employment. While the sector contributes £66.4 billion annually to the economy, one of the biggest challenges is finding the very best tech talent and convincing them that start-ups are the place to be."

The Bootstrapped Initiative 

Milkroundabout’s 'bootstrapped initiative' has been successful and helped many early-stage startups throughout the years. They offer highly subsidized pitch spaces to bootstrapped teams* and currently seek underrepresented groups to help; teams with a female on their founding team and founders under 25.

It’s inclusive, and it puts the little startups in the same room as the scale-ups and high growth tech companies. It is integral to the company’s founding values of inclusivity and cross-pollination. The Initiative is championed by co-founders Cristiana Camisotti and Pete Smith

Bootstrapped startups have no external investment and they are usually two-person teams working from a tech hub, coffee shop, or their bedrooms.

Milkroundabout has helped 10-20 bootstrapped companies at each event in London and Edinburgh since 2011 and of the 138 Bootstrapped companies supported in their infancy, they have gone on to raise $91,968,400 in investment. These include UK success stories Citymapper, Constant Commerce, and Osper.

The Bootstrapped initiative is now also offered to bootstrapped companies at their events in Brooklyn where they are known as The Round.

Events

First event 

The inaugural event was held on 15 May 2011 with more than 30 companies in attendance. The event attracted more than 500 developers.

Second event 

The second event in the series was held on 30 October 2011. 102 start-ups exhibited. TechCrunch covered the event. More than 500 jobs were offered and more than 1200 developers attended.

Third event 

The third event was held on 26 and 27 May 2012. This time it was a two-day event focusing on product management, user interface design, and analysts on the first day, and developers, testers, and project managers on the second.

Fourth event 

The fourth event was held on 10 and 11 November 2012.

Fifth event 

The fifth event was held on 11 and 12 May 2013.

Sixth event 

The sixth event was held on 16 and 17 November 2013.

Seventh event 

The seventh event was held on 10 and 11 May 2014.

Eighth event 

The eighth event was held on 15 and 16 November 2014.

Ninth event 

The ninth event was held on 9 and 10 May 2015 with over 200 companies and 3000 candidates attending.

Silicon Milkroundabout Scotland 1.0 

The inaugural event was held on 7 March 2015 in Edinburgh with 40 companies and 450 attendees.

References

External links 
 Official site
 Silicon Milkroundabout Flickr page

Information technology organisations based in the United Kingdom
Recruitment
Computer occupations
Science and technology in London
Graduate recruitment